Nicholas "Nick" O'Connor is a fictional character from the British Channel 4 soap opera Hollyoaks, played by Darren Bransford. He made his first appearance in 2001 before leaving in 2004.

Character development
The character's style was changed and the wardrobe department started to dress Nick in hats. Bransford was delighted with the change because he could have messy hair and just take a hat from the department. The character was written out in 2004.

Storylines
Wacky, gregarious and sensitive, Nick arrives as a fresher with best friend Jodie Nash (Kate McEnery). He is immediately involved in controversy when he is attacked outside The Dog in The Pond for being gay. Nick copes well with the situation due to the support of Jodie. Nick begins dating Greg, whom he meets at a gay club, but he ends the relationship when Nick discovers that he was two-timing him. Nick goes on to become confused about his sexuality after he has doubts about being gay.

With Jodie upset over the death of her brother, Jamie (Stefan Booth), Nick tries to comfort her and the pair end up sleeping together. Jodie leaves Hollyoaks to clear her head, and Nick begins to date Nathan Rogers, who works at Il Gnosh. When Jodie returns, the pair decide to be just friends. Nick realises that he feels comfortable with his homosexuality due to him having strong feelings for Nathan. However, Nick's parents do not know about his sexuality. Nathan encourages Nick to come clean and the pair go together to Nick's farmhouse to tell them the truth. However, Nick's father's reaction is bad, and he forces Nick and Nathan out of the house. This leaves Nick shattered and terribly upset, despite Nathan trying to comfort him.

Nick's mother phones Nick to tell him that his father has just had a heart attack. Nick rushes to his bedside, and his father tells him that the farm is not doing well and that he needs an extra pair of hands. Nick decides to help his father out. Nathan has plans to go on holiday, but Nick decides he has to help his father due to his condition. Nathan is frustrated by this and asks Nick to choose between him and his parents. Nathan ends up breaking up with Nick, which leaves him devastated. Trying to make a success of his life, Nick completes a degree in arts and wants to travel around the world. However, his father has other plans as he wants Nick to run the farm. Once again, Nick has to choose between his choice and his parents, but this time Nick thinks it is best for him to do what he wants to do. Bidding a farewell to Hollyoaks, Nick leaves feeling free and being able to do whatever he wants to do.

Reception
Sam Soap writing for Inside Soap magazine opined that Nick, Dannii Carbone (Christina Baily) and Kristian Hargreaves (Max Brown) never had any storylines when they moved into their flat. He added that he was past caring about what the forgotten character did.

References

Hollyoaks characters
Television characters introduced in 2001
Male characters in television
Fictional gay males
Fictional LGBT characters in television